"That's Enough of That" is a debut song written by Randy Albright, Lisa Silver and Mark D. Sanders, and recorded by American country music artist Mila Mason.  It was released in August 1996 as the first single and title track from the album That's Enough of That.  The song reached #18 on the Billboard Hot Country Singles & Tracks chart.

Chart performance

References

 
1996 debut singles
1996 songs
Mila Mason songs
Songs written by Mark D. Sanders
Atlantic Records singles
Songs written by Lisa Silver